Barasala  (or) Namakarana Dolarohana (or) Naam Karan is a traditional ceremony of naming a newborn baby among Hindu communities of India. Jews celebrate this ceremony in the name of Javed Habat or Brit Mila. In United Kingdom, the Infant Baptism ceremony resembles Balasara. It was also celebrated in ancient Greece and Persia.

Process
The Barasala (is authentically called as Balasare) is usually celebrated on the 11th day, 16th day, 21st day, 3rd month or 29th month after the birth of a child. Brahmins determine an auspicious time for the ceremony, which is conducted either at a temple or at home. Prior to this function, the house is cleaned well to perform some pujas. On the day, the baby is given a bath, clothed and placed in a cradle. Women gather around the cradle to sing traditional songs. In the ritual, the mother is honored and the child is blessed by the elders of the family and community. The father whispers the baby's name into its ear three times. The name is also written on rice spread on the floor or on a tray. The child's maternal uncle takes a gold ring dipped in a mixture of cow milk & honey and puts it on the baby's tongue. The elders then give blessings to the child that it may earn a good reputation, become a great person, and have a bright future. Many communities combine this ceremony with cradle ceremony on 21st day after checking out auspicious time and date without Rahukalam and durmuhurtam. 
The cradle is cleaned and turmeric and vermilion is applied and decorated it with flowers. Tambulam is placed in the four corners of the swing, Baby is placed in the cradle by the elder member from the kids fathers family with or without the priest chanting mantras while the kid is put in and the elder swings the cradle 3 times followed by akshintalu and bless the kid. Blessings from the rest of the family follows, the entire ceremony can be done either at home or in a temple.

Purpose
Although the child cannot understand the purpose, the ceremony helps the parents to realize that they have to shape their child into a good citizen and show a bright future to the child. It also helps the guests to realize the greatness and sweetness of human life.

See also
Nāmakaraṇa

References 

Culture of Andhra Pradesh
Culture of Telangana